Yevgeniya Alekseyevna Lamonova (born 9 August 1983 in Kurchatov, Russia) is a Russian foil fencer.

She won the gold medal in the foil team event at the 2008 Summer Olympics.

External links 

1983 births
Living people
People from Kurchatov, Russia
Russian female foil fencers
Fencers at the 2008 Summer Olympics
Olympic fencers of Russia
Olympic gold medalists for Russia
Olympic medalists in fencing
Medalists at the 2008 Summer Olympics
Universiade medalists in fencing
Universiade bronze medalists for Russia
Medalists at the 2003 Summer Universiade
Sportspeople from Kursk Oblast
21st-century Russian women